The 2010 IRB Junior World Championship was the third annual international rugby union competition for Under 20 national teams, this competition replaced the now defunct under 19 and under 21 world championships. The event was organised by rugby's governing body, the International Rugby Board (IRB). The competition was contested by 12 men's junior national teams and was held in June 2010 and hosted by Argentina. The competition was won by New Zealand.

Venues

Pool stage

Pool A

{| class="wikitable" style="text-align: center;"
|-
!width="200"|Team
!width="20"|Pld
!width="20"|W
!width="20"|D
!width="20"|L
!width="20"|TF
!width="20"|PF
!width="20"|PA
!width="25"|+/-
!width="20"|BP
!width="20"|Pts
|-
|align=left| 
|3||3||0||0||22||164||28||+136||3||15
|-
|align=left| 
|3||2||0||1||5||63||59||+4||0||8
|-
|align=left| 
|3||1||0||2||3||29||87||−58||0||4
|-
|align=left| 
|3||0||0||3||3||32||114||−82||1||1
|}
Source

Pool B

{| class="wikitable" style="text-align: center;"
|-
!width="200"|Team
!width="20"|Pld
!width="20"|W
!width="20"|D
!width="20"|L
!width="20"|TF
!width="20"|PF
!width="20"|PA
!width="25"|+/-
!width="20"|BP
!width="20"|Pts
|-
|align=left| 
|3||3||0||0||9||101||52||+49||1||13
|-
|align=left| 
|3||2||0||1||5||65||62||+3||1||9
|-
|align=left| 
|3||1||0||2||8||69||100||−31||0||4
|-
|align=left| 
|3||0||0||3||5||64||85||−21||2||2
|}
Source

Pool C

{| class="wikitable" style="text-align: center;"
|-
!width="200"|Team
!width="20"|Pld
!width="20"|W
!width="20"|D
!width="20"|L
!width="20"|TF
!width="20"|PF
!width="20"|PA
!width="25"|+/-
!width="20"|BP
!width="20"|Pts
|-
|align=left| 
|3||3||0||0||25||167||53||+114||3||15
|-
|align=left| 
|3||2||0||1||20||148||56||+92||4||12
|-
|align=left| 
|3||1||0||2||4||40||134||−94||0||4
|-
|align=left| 
|3||0||0||3||2||22||134||−112||0||0
|}
Source

Knockout stage

9th place play-offs

Play-off semi finals

11th place play-off

9th place play-off

5th place play-offs

Play-off semi finals

7th place play-off

5th place play-off

Championship play-offs

Championship semi finals

3rd place play-off

Final

Final standings

Media coverage
IRB broadcasting rights:

: ESPN+ (All matches)
: FOX (Australian matches plus semis and finals)
: BandSports (12 matches)
: Setanta (12 matches)
: Elijah Communications (12 matches)
: Fiji TV (Fiji matches on delay plus 12 matches)
: Setanta Ireland (12 matches)
: Ananey Communications (12 matches)
: Sky (12 matches)
: TV Niue (12 matches)
: DTH (12 matches)
: SBC (12 matches)
: Solomon Islands National TV (12 matches)
: Digicel (12 matches)
: Sky (12 matches)
: S4C (Welsh matches plus semis and finals)
Latin America: ESPN Sur (Host broadcaster)
Middle East: Showtime (10 matches)
Pan Asia: Eurosport (12 matches)
Pan Europe: Eurosport (12 matches)
Southern Africa: M-Net/SuperSport (12 matches)

See also
2010 IRB Junior World Rugby Trophy

References

External links
 2010 IRB Junior World Championship match schedule

2010
2010 rugby union tournaments for national teams
2010 in Argentine rugby union
International rugby union competitions hosted by Argentina
rugby union